The men's 110 metres hurdles was an event at the 1956 Summer Olympics in Melbourne, Australia. There were 24 athletes from 15 nations. The event took place on 27 and 28 November 1956. The maximum number of athletes per nation had been set at 3 since the 1930 Olympic Congress. The event was won by Lee Calhoun of the United States. It was the fifth of nine consecutive American victories, and the 11th overall gold medal for the United States in the 110 metres hurdles. It was also the third of four consecutive American podium sweeps, and the seventh overall sweep by the United States in the event.

Jack Davis won silver for the second consecutive Games. The United States had won 28 of the 35 medals in the high hurdles between 1896 and 1952, all by different hurdlers; Davis was the first American to win a second medal. By contrast, two of the five non-American medalists had won two medals apiece, so Davis was the third man overall to do so.

Summary

Jack Davis came into the Olympics with the world record, having run 13.4 in a qualifying heat at the national championships a week before the Olympic trials.  That was 5 months earlier.  Here the three Americans were the class of the field, all three running the semi-final in 14.0, almost half a second faster than any other competitor.

In the final, Lee Calhoun in lane 2 got the edge, leading by half a meter by the third hurdle.  Davis, across the track in lane 5, could only keep pace but couldn't make up the gap.  He gave his best effort to lean at the tape but was clearly beaten by Calhoun.  Four metres back, Joel Shankle completed the American sweep, three metres ahead of Martin Lauer.  Almost three years later, Lauer would get Davis' world record.  Calhoun would equal it a year after that, in the season leading up to his repeating as Olympic Champion in 1960 leading another American sweep over Lauer.

Background

This was the 13th appearance of the event, which is one of 12 athletics events to have been held at every Summer Olympics. Two finalists from 1952 returned: silver medalist Jack Davis of the United States and fifth-place finisher Ken Doubleday of Australia. Davis, having also won the 1956 AAU championship with a new world record, was a "slight favorite" over countryman Lee Calhoun, who had tied Davis for first at the U.S. Olympic trials. The third American, Joel Shankle, was not quite at the level of Davis and Calhoun but was still good enough to give the United States a good chance at another medal sweep.

Colombia made its first appearance in the event; Germany competed as the "United Team of Germany" for the first time. The United States made its 13th appearance, the only nation to have competed in the 110 metres hurdles in each Games to that point.

Competition format

The competition used the basic three-round format introduced in 1908. The first round consisted of four heats, with 6 or 7 hurdlers each (before withdrawals; there ultimately were 6 starters in each heat). The top three hurdlers in each heat advanced to the semifinals. The 12 semifinalists were divided into two semifinals of 6 hurdlers each; the top three hurdlers in each advanced to the 6-man final.

Records

These were the standing world and Olympic records (in seconds) prior to the 1956 Summer Olympics.

Lee Calhoun and Jack Davis were both officially clocked at 13.5 seconds in the final to break the Olympic record.

Schedule

All times are Australian Eastern Standard Time (UTC+10)

Results

Round 1

Heat 1

Heat 2

Heat 3

Heat 4

Overall results for round 1

Semifinals

Semifinal 1

Semifinal 2

Overall results for semifinals

Final

References

External links
 Official Report
 Results

M
Sprint hurdles at the Olympics
Men's events at the 1956 Summer Olympics